The 2023 Philadelphia mayoral election will be held on  to elect the mayor of Philadelphia. Nominees for the Democratic and Republican parties will be selected through primaries on May 16, 2023. 

Incumbent Democratic mayor Jim Kenney is term limited and cannot seek reelection to a third term. Philadelphia's three most recent mayors were previously members of Philadelphia City Council who resigned their seats to run for mayor due to the "resign to run" provision of Philadelphia's election law. Ed Rendell was the last mayor that did not come from City Council.

Notable Democratic candidates include former city councilmembers Allan Domb, Derek Green, Helen Gym, Maria Quiñones-Sánchez, and Cherelle Parker; state representative Amen Brown; former municipal judge James DeLeon; former city controller Rebecca Rhynhart; businessman Jeff Brown; and pastor Warren Bloom Sr.

The presumptive Republican nominee is former longtime At-Large City Councilmember David Oh, who is running unopposed in his party's primary.

Democratic primary

Background
In 2019, incumbent Mayor Jim Kenney was re-elected to his second and final term. Polling in March 2022 showed Kenney with a 55% approval rating among Philadelphia Democrats, while an equal percentage said the city was moving in the wrong direction.

Gun violence and public safety is a top issue in the election. While Philadelphia saw 8% fewer homicides in 2022 than in 2021, the city recorded over 500 homicide for the second year in a row. After a shooting at the city's July 4 celebration, Mayor Kenney told reporters he will "be happy" when he is no longer mayor, prompting City Council members Derek S. Green and Allan Domb to call for his resignation.

In August 2022, Allan Domb resigned from City Council ahead of an expected run for mayor but did not announce his candidacy until November of that year. In September, Derek Green, Maria Quiñones-Sánchez, and Cherelle Parker also resigned from City Council and announced their candidacies. City Controller Rebecca Rhynhart joined the race in October, followed by ShopRite retailer Jeff Brown and City Council member Helen Gym in November. State Representative Amen Brown announced his campaign in December.

Candidates

Declared

Other declared candidates
Delscia Gray

Did not qualify
Joseph Anthony Tartaglia

Declined
 Cindy Bass, Philadelphia City Councilmember from the 8th district (2012–present) (running for re-election)
Vincent Hughes, Pennsylvania state senator from the 7th district (1994–present)
Jason Kelce, center for the Philadelphia Eagles
Keith Leaphart, entrepreneur, philanthropist, physician and Executive on Loan to the city of Philadelphia (2007)
Michael Nutter, Mayor of Philadelphia (2008–2016) (endorsed Rhynhart)
Mike Stack, former Lieutenant Governor of Pennsylvania (2015–2019)

Campaign

Early months
In November 2022, The Philadelphia Inquirer reported that former city councilmember Cherelle Parker had the "competitive advantage as the race gets underway." The Inquirer credited her "competitive advantage" to her close ties to labor unions in Philadelphia and her role as the Democratic leader of Northwest Philadelphia's 50th Ward, which is home to older middle-class Black voters, who boast some of the highest voter turnout.

Helen Gym has been described as the favored candidate by progressive activists. She has faced early attacks from fellow candidates, who have criticized her votes in City Council to oppose greater funding for the Philadelphia Police Department.

In December 2022, Jeff Brown became the first candidate to run TV ads. The ads highlight his work opening grocery stores in "underserved communities" and accuses his rivals from City Council of inaction. This coincided with Brown receiving endorsements from some of Philadelphia's most powerful labor unions including the chapters of the American Federation of State, County, and Municipal Employees, Transport Workers Union of America and United Food and Commercial Workers. Brown faced controversy when he aired an ad that showed an old clip of former First Lady Michelle Obama praising him. An advisor to Obama said that she does not get involved in Democratic primaries and criticized the ad for implying that she had endorsed Brown.

Endorsements

Polling

Graphical summary

Results

Republican primary

Candidates

Presumptive nominee

Campaign
David Oh, a former longtime At-Large City Councilmember, is the only Republican to run for Mayor. Despite Philadelphia being a heavily Democratic city, Oh has established a brand as a Republican willing to clash with both parties and his cultivated a unique base of supporters, particularly among immigrant voters. Oh became the Presumptive Nominee after being unopposed in the primary.

Endorsements

Results

Independents

Candidates

Potential 
Fareed Abdullah, Democratic candidate for the Pennsylvania House of Representatives in 2020, City Council At-Large in 2019

References

Notes

External links 
Official campaign websites
 Jeff Brown (D) for Mayor
 James DeLeon (D) for Mayor
 Allan Domb (D) for Mayor
 Derek S. Green (D) for Mayor
 Helen Gym (D) for Mayor
 Cherelle Parker (D) for Mayor
 Maria Quiñones-Sánchez (D) for Mayor
 Rebecca Rhynhart (D) for Mayor
 David Oh (R) for Mayor

2023 in Philadelphia
Philadelphia
Philadelphia
2023